The Song of Solomon, or Song of Songs, is a book of the Old Testament.

Song of Solomon may also refer to:
Song of Solomon (novel), 1977, by Toni Morrison
"The Song of Solomon", a song on Kate Bush's 1993 album The Red Shoes
 "Song of Solomon", a song from the 2009 album Animals as Leaders by Animals as Leaders